'Tween 12 and 20 is a syndicated advice column, targeted to teenagers and young adults, written by Dr. Robert Wallace, and distributed by the Copley Press arm of Creators Syndicate.

Background
The column began in 1976 and was originally published in the Orange County Register (California) several times a week. Today, the column is syndicated in more than 300 newspapers.

Common topics of "'Tween 12 and 20" columns include dating; relationships between teenagers, other teenagers, parents and teachers; health; and the transition from high school and college.

Wallace - a longtime school teacher, coach and administrator - lives in Galesburg, Illinois, and is a graduate of Knox College.

External links
 Site at Creators Syndicate

References

Advice columns